The Musée de l'Holographie was a notable museum of holography located in Paris, France. The museum was established in 1980, and located for some years in the Forum des Halles. According to S. Johnston, it closed its doors in 1994. But in fact, it was in April 1996. The museum's collections are now shown in touring exhibits in France and around the world.

See also 
 List of museums in Paris

References 
 Musée de l'Holographie
 Paris.org entry
 Museums of Paris entry
 Sean Johnston, Holographic Visions: A History of New Science, Oxford University Press, 2006, pages 344-345, 432. .
 A. Christakis, "Musée de l'Holographie of Paris and Its Activities: 1980-1994", in Jeong, T.H. (ed.), Proceedings of the Fifth International Symposium on Display Holography, Lake Forest College, Lake Forest, Illinois, USA, 1994.
 Musee de l'Holographie of Paris and its activities: 1980/1994  Proceedings Vol. 2333, Fifth International Symposium on Display Holography, Tung H. Jeong, Editors, pp. 245–246
 Le Musee de l'Holographie de Paris and its activities: 1980/1990 Proceedings Vol. 1238, Three-Dimensional Holography: Science, Culture, Education, Tung H. Jeong; Vladimir B. Markov, Editors, pp. 348–350
 Large holograms in traveling exhibitions  Proceedings Vol. 2043, Holographic Imaging and Materials, Tung H. Jeong, Editors, pp. 112–122
 Development of integral holographic motion pictures Proceedings Vol. 2333, Fifth International Symposium on Display Holography, Tung H. Jeong, Editors, pp. 187–197

Defunct museums in Paris
Holography